was a feudal domain under the Tokugawa shogunate of Edo period Japan, located in Kōzuke Province (modern-day Gunma Prefecture), Japan. It was centered on Isesaki jin'ya in what is now part of the city of Isesaki, Gunma. Isesaki was ruled through most of its history by a junior branch of the Sakai clan.

History
Isesaki Domain was originally created in 1601 for Inagaki Nagashige, a hatamoto formerly in the service of the Imagawa clan who had transferred his allegiance to Tokugawa Ieyasu. After Tokugawa Ieyasu took control over the Kantō region in 1590, he assigned estates with revenues of 3000 koku to Inagaki Nagashige in Kōzuke Province, and entrusted him with the defense of Ogo Castle. He was awarded additional estates in 1601, following Ieyasu’s defeat at the hands of Uesugi Kagekatsu at Aizu, which elevated him to the rank of daimyō. His son was transferred in 1616, and Isesaki was thereafter ruled by three junior branches of the Sakai clan until the end of the Edo period.

During the Bakumatsu period, forces of Iseskai Domain played a role in the suppression of the Tengutō Rebellion; however the next-to-last daimyo, Sakai Tadatsuyo was quick to join the imperial side in the Boshin War.  After the end of the conflict, with the abolition of the han system in July 1871, Isesaki Domain became "Isesaki Prefecture", which later became part of Gunma Prefecture.

The domain had a population of 1964 samurai in 520 households per a census in 1763.

Holdings at the end of the Edo period
Unlike most domains in the han system, which consisted of several discontinuous territories calculated to provide the assigned kokudaka, based on periodic cadastral surveys and projected agricultural yields, Isesaki was a relatively compact territory.

Kōzuke Province
18 villages in Sai District
30 villages in Nawa District

List of daimyōs

References

External links
 Isesaki on "Edo 300 HTML"

Notes

Domains of Japan
1601 establishments in Japan
States and territories established in 1601
1871 disestablishments in Japan
States and territories disestablished in 1871
Kōzuke Province